Umtshezi Local Municipality was an administrative area in the Uthukela District of KwaZulu-Natal in South Africa. uMtshezi is an isiZulu name word for Bushman or San. The name uMtshezi refers to the Bushman River. After municipal elections on 3 August 2016 it was merged into the larger Inkosi Langalibalele Local Municipality.

Main places
The 2001 census divided the municipality into the following main places:

Politics 
The municipal council consisted of seventeen members elected by mixed-member proportional representation. Nine councillors were elected by first-past-the-post voting in nine wards, while the remaining eight were chosen from party lists so that the total number of party representatives was proportional to the number of votes received. In the election of 18 May 2011 no party obtained a majority; the African National Congress won eight seats, the Inkatha Freedom Party five, and the National Freedom Party three. The following table shows the results of the election.

The ANC and the NFP formed a coalition to govern the majority. Subsequently, the ANC won a by-election in a ward previously held by the IFP, giving the ANC a majority of nine seats.

References

External links
 http://www.umtshezi.co.za/

Former local municipalities of South Africa